Sesia bembeciformis, the lunar hornet moth, is a moth of the family Sesiidae. It is found in Europe.

The wingspan is 32–42 mm. The length of the forewings is 15–19 mm.

Sesia bembeciformis is hardly distinguishable from its closest congener Sesia apiformis. However, apiformis has yellow 'epaulettes' on the "shoulders" directly above the wing bases; Sesia bembeciformis is dark coloured at this point except for the yellow neck ring.bembeciformis is also smaller and has a black head. In general, females are considerably larger than males. It resembles a big hornet (Vespa crabro) really well - an instance of mimicry.

The moths appear in June, July and August, they are then found resting on the trunks willows . These include sal willow (Salix caprea), ash willow (Salix cinerea) and ear willow (Salix aurita). The eggs are laid on the bark. The larvae first gnaw between the bark and the wood, but later crawl further into the stem. Larva development takes 3 – 4 years. The species has a hidden way of life, and the imago lives only briefly, which makes it easily overlooked.

External links

Lunar hornet moth at UKmoths
Lepidoptera of Belgium
Lepiforum.de
Vlindernet.nl 

Moths described in 1806
Sesiidae
Moths of Europe
Moths of Asia
Taxa named by Jacob Hübner